George Agnew may refer to:
Sir George Agnew, 2nd Baronet (1852–1941), British art dealer, publisher, and politician
George Agnew (Australian politician) (1853–1934), Member of the Queensland Legislative Assembly
George B. Agnew (1868–1941), American politician
Sir George Agnew, 7th Baronet (born 1953), British landowner, great-grandson of Sir George Agnew, 2nd Baronet